In Bhutan, political parties need to be registered with Election Commission to contest National Assembly elections. Political parties can only contest National Assembly elections, since being an independent is a requirement for contesting National Council and local government elections.

Besides the official registered parties that came into existence after the democratisation of Bhutan, many Bhutanese parties have been operating in exile since the 1990s. Most of these parties are run by exiled people from the Lhotshampa community from the refugee camps in Nepal.

Official parties
In Bhutan, political parties need to be registered with Election Commission of Bhutan to participate in the Bhutanese elections.

Active parties

Deregistered parties
In 2018, Druk Chirwang Tshogpa was deregistered by the Election Commission on its own request.

In 2023, the Bhutan Kuen-Nyam Party deregistered after years of low activity. The party had failed to find a new leader after Neten Zangmo resigned the position in 2018.

Other political parties
The following parties are all based in exile.
 Bhutan Democratic Socialist Party
 Bhutan Gorkha National Liberation Front
 Bhutan National Congress
 Bhutan National Democratic Party
 Bhutan National Party
 Bhutan Peoples' Party
 Bhutanese Movement Steering Committee
 Communist Party of Bhutan (Marxist–Leninist–Maoist)
 Bhutan Tiger Force 
 Druk National Congress

The Druk National Congress was formed in exile in Kathmandu, Nepal on June 16, 1994.

On August 26, 2010, Bhutanese political parties in exile formed an umbrella group to pursue a "unified democratic movement led by Rongthong Kunley Dorji, President of the Druk National Congress. The group's offices opened in Kathmandu in November 2010, and it seems to receive some measure of support from the Nepalese government.

See also
Politics of Bhutan
Constitution of Bhutan 
Lists of political parties

References

External links

Bhutan
 
Political parties
Political parties
Bhutan